Keko or KEKO may refer to:

People
Keko (footballer, born 1973), Spanish footballer
Keko (footballer, born 1991), Spanish footballer
Keko (Guyanese rapper) (born 1974), Guyanese rapper
Keko (Ugandan rapper) (born 1987), Ugandan rapper

Other uses
Keko (administrative ward), in Tanzania
KEKO (FM), a radio station of Texas, United States
Elko Regional Airport (ICAO code:KEKO), an airport in Nevada, United States